Charlotteville is the name of  places that have usually been named after Charlotte of Mecklenburg-Strelitz, the queen consort of United Kingdom's King George III (1738-1820).

Charlotteville may refer to:

Places

U.S. 
 Charlotteville, Georgia, an unincorporated community
 Charlotteville, North Carolina
 Charlotteville, New York, a hamlet in Summit, Schoharie County, New York

Other 
 Charlotteville, a village lying on the north-eastern tip of Tobago
 Charlotteville Centre, Ontario the former name of a medium-sized hamlet now named "Walsh"
 Charlotteville Township, Ontario
 Charlotteville, an area of Guildford in Surrey, England
 Charlotteville Cycling Club, based in Guildford, England

See also 

 Charlottesville (disambiguation)